The 2019 French Indoor Athletics Championships was the 48th edition of the national championship in indoor track and field for France. It was held on 16–17 February at the Stadium Miramas Métropole in Miramas, Bouches-du-Rhône. A total of 28 events (divided evenly between the sexes) were contested over the two-day competition.

Results

Men

Women

References

Results
 Les championnats de France en salle 2019  

French Indoor Athletics Championships
French Indoor Athletics Championships
French Indoor Athletics Championships
French Indoor Athletics Championships
Sport in Bouches-du-Rhône